The Napoletana is a breed of domestic goat from the area south of Naples, in Campania in southern Italy. It is raised on the slopes of Vesuvius, on the slopes of the Monti Lattari, and in the Agro Nocerino Sarnese which lies between them. The origin of the breed is unknown. It may derive from goats of African origin imported to the area in the early years of the twentieth century; the alternative name Torca Nera, "black Turkish goat", suggests an origin in the Mediterranean basin.

The Napoletana is one of the forty-three autochthonous Italian goat breeds of limited distribution for which a herdbook is kept by the Associazione Nazionale della Pastorizia, the Italian national association of sheep- and goat-breeders; the herdbook was established in 2002. The Napoletana was in the past numerous. At the end of 2013 the registered population was reported as 71.

Use

The milk yield of the Napoletana is high. In a lactation of 165 days it averages  litres for primiparous and  litres for pluriparous nannies. The milk has 4.7% fat, 3.4% protein and contains 5% lactose.

References

Goat breeds
Dairy goat breeds
Meat goat breeds
Goat breeds originating in Italy
Ark of Taste foods